In the 2017–18 season, CS Constantine competed in the Ligue 1 for the 20th season, as well as the Algerian Cup.

Summary season
In the new season the CS Constantine laid off ten players, including The goalkeeper in the last four seasons Cédric Si Mohamed, and defender Arslane Mazari, Midfield former international Mourad Meghni due to repeated injuries, Abdelhak Sameur and attackers Mohamed Amine Aoudia and Ivorian Manucho Which ended his loan period, After that coach Abdelkader Amrani renewed his contract with the CS Constantine for two seasons. after he led the team for six months last season. and then put a list of the names of the players who must be brought, the first international goalkeeper Chamseddine Rahmani from MO Béjaïa then the striker Lamine Abid from NA Hussein Dey for two seasons the first foreign player this season contracted with him is the international Burkinabé Ousmane Sylla for three seasons, five days after that the team contracted with three players and they are Said Arroussi, Sid Ali Lamri from ES Sétif and Sofiane Khadir from MO Béjaïa. Then the last player to sign with him was Mali international Moctar Cissé from Albanian club KF Tirana.

Like every season the team prepared for this season in Tunisia and in the city of Hammam Bourguiba during the period from July 20 to 31, a preparation camp ahead of the new season of Ligue 1 which will begin on August 25th, this pre-season internship, the second after the Constantine reunion which ran from July 15 to 19. the first friendly match against US Monastir ended in favor of Les Sanafir with a single goal. this second cycle of pre-season preparation will be followed by another internship in Gammarth between 6 and 18 August which will be devoted to the physical aspect of the technico-tactical part with friendly matches in the program. After the end of both internships in Tunisia and returning to Algeria in preparation for the first round in Ligue 1, CSC aspires to play the first roles this season.

The first match was against NA Hussein Dey at home and won 3–1 two of them for El Hedi Belameiri after that in the first away game was defeated against the DRB Tadjenanet 2–1 starting from the third round the team looked great results and the victory against USM Bel-Abbès with a single goal from Moctar Cissé then at the top of the fifth round against MC Alger, they scored a valuable win from the new player Lamine Abid, two weeks after that they managed to achieve the first victory outside the home against US Biskra double Abid to take the lead with 13 points, four days later and in the east Derby against ES Sétif and after he was late with a goal until the 88 minutes managed to achieve a historic victory after scoring two goals in two minutes. then CS Constantine followed the positive results and maintain his lead in the 11th round against USM Alger, the CSC achieved surprise by winning two goals after they were late by goal in the first half after the game coach Amrani said that winning the championship is not the goal of the team and that there are still 19 games. but in round 13 and against JS Kabylie they won a valuable win and it is the second win away from home, two goals from Abid who reached the tenth goal of the season, and then declared Amrani that winning the championship became a goal after it became the elves from the big teams such as ES Sétif and USM Alger. the start of this season is the best since his ascension in 2011–12 season and is looking for his second title after the first season 1996–97.

Pre-season

Mid-season

Competitions

Overview

{| class="wikitable" style="text-align: center"
|-
!rowspan=2|Competition
!colspan=8|Record
!rowspan=2|Started round
!rowspan=2|Final position / round
!rowspan=2|First match	
!rowspan=2|Last match
|-
!
!
!
!
!
!
!
!
|-
| Ligue 1

|  
| style="background:gold;"| Winners
| 26 August 2017 
| 18 May 2018
|-
| Algerian Cup

| Round of 64 
| Round of 32
| 29 December 2017 
| 16 January 2018
|-
! Total

Ligue 1

League table

Results summary

Results by round

Matches

Algerian Cup

Squad information

Playing statistics

|-
! colspan=10 style=background:#dcdcdc; text-align:center| Goalkeepers

|-
! colspan=10 style=background:#dcdcdc; text-align:center| Defenders

|-
! colspan=10 style=background:#dcdcdc; text-align:center| Midfielders

|-
! colspan=10 style=background:#dcdcdc; text-align:center| Forwards

|-
! colspan=10 style=background:#dcdcdc; text-align:center| Players transferred out during the season

Goalscorers

Squad list
As of August 25, 2017.

Transfers

In

Out

Notes

References

2017-18
CS Constantine